The Criminal Law Act 1967 is an Act of the Parliament of the United Kingdom that made some major changes to English criminal law, as part of wider liberal reforms by the Labour government elected in 1966. Most of it is still in force.

Territorial scope 

Although it is an Act of the Parliament of the United Kingdom, most of its provisions (except for some minor exceptions) apply only to England and Wales. 

Several of the Act's provisions were adopted, word for word, for Northern Ireland by the Criminal Law Act (Northern Ireland) 1967 (c 18) (NI) and the Criminal Justice (Miscellaneous Provisions) Act (Northern Ireland) 1968 (c 28) (NI). The Republic of Ireland similarly adopted some of its provisions, again word for word, in the Criminal Law Act 1997.

Structure 

The Act has three parts. Part I abolished the distinction between felony and misdemeanour and makes consequential provisions. Part II abolished a number of obsolete crimes. Part III contains supplementary provisions.

Part I – Felony and misdemeanour

This Part implements the recommendations made by the Criminal Law Revision Committee in their seventh report.

Section 1 abolished the distinction between felonies and misdemeanours. Originally, all crimes in English law were categorised in a hierarchy of treason, felony, and misdemeanour, each with its own rules of procedure and evidence. (Treason had been brought in line with felony in 1945.) The 1967 Act abolished felonies and stated that all former felonies would be tried according to the rules of procedure and evidence that applied in trials and pre-trial hearings for misdemeanours, whether the felony had been committed before or after the Act was passed. This also had the effect of abolishing the offences of misprision of felony and compounding a felony (but these offences were replaced with new ones in sections 4 and 5). Although all offences were now misdemeanours, the maximum penalties were not affected.

Section 2 created a new category of arrestable offences, since powers of arrest had depended on whether an offence was a felony or a misdemeanour. Arrestable offences were defined as crimes for which the maximum sentence for an adult was five years or more. The section set out the circumstances in which a citizen or a constable could arrest somebody without a court warrant (police powers were more extensive than a civilian's).

Section 2 was repealed and replaced with section 24 of the Police and Criminal Evidence Act 1984, which was broadly similar to section 2 but also applied to some less serious offences. Section 24 was supplemented by a section 25 which created new powers (for constables only) to arrest those suspected of "non-arrestable offences" in certain circumstances. Sections 24 and 25 were controversially amended by the Serious Organised Crime and Police Act 2005, which abolished the difference between arrestable and non-arrestable offences and substituted one set of police arrest powers for all offences, irrespective of the maximum sentence. Citizens' arrest was confined to indictable offences. This change took effect from 1 January 2006.

Section 3 replaces the common law rules on self-defence in English law, such as the duty to retreat. It simply requires that any force used must be "reasonable in the circumstances". It is still in force today and states:

(Further provision about when force is "reasonable" was made by section 76 of the Criminal Justice and Immigration Act 2008.) The definition of what constitutes a 'crime' was clarified under R v Jones (Margaret), R v Milling et al [2006] UKHL 16, which stated it covered any domestic criminal offence under the law of England and Wales.)

Section 4 created a new offence of assisting anyone who had committed an arrestable offence, "with intent to impede his apprehension or prosecution". This replaced the rules on accessories after the fact in felony cases. The penalty for this offence is linked to the penalty for whatever offence the original offender has committed (between three and ten years' imprisonment).

Section 5(1) created a new offence which replaced misprision and compounding of felony. It stated that a person who has information which might lead to the prosecution of an arrestable offence and who agrees to accept consideration (other than [victim] compensation for the offence) in exchange for not disclosing that information to the authorities is liable to two years' imprisonment.
When the concept of an "arrestable offence" was abolished, sections 4 and 5(1) were amended so that they now apply to any "relevant offence", which is defined in identical terms to the original 1967 definition of arrestable offence. This significantly reduced the scope of these offences from the wider 1984 definition, which had been steadily extended over the years.
A person may not be prosecuted for these offences without the permission of the Director of Public Prosecutions or a Crown prosecutor.

Section 5(2) creates the offence commonly known as "wasting police time", committed by giving false information to the police "tending to show that an offence has been committed, or to give rise to apprehension for the safety of any persons or property, or tending to show that he has information material to any police inquiry". The maximum sentence is six months. A person may not be prosecuted for this offence without the permission of the Director of Public Prosecutions or a Crown prosecutor.

Section 5(5) provides that the compounding of an offence other than treason is not an offence otherwise than under section 5 of the Act. This means that:
 The common law offence of compounding treason is preserved.
 The common law offence of compounding a felony, and (if it existed) the common law offence of compounding a misdemeanour, were abolished on 1 January 1968. (In Working Paper No.72, at paragraph 43, the Law Commission suggest that the latter offence might "perhaps" have existed, but offer no explanation.)

Consequential repeals on s.5(5) (s.10(2) and Sch 3, Pt III)
Section 33 of the Metropolitan Police Courts Act 1839.
Section 48 of the Pawnbrokers Act 1872.

Section 6 deals with the procedures for arraignment and verdict. In particular, it deals with alternative verdicts (or alternative pleas). When a defendant is found not guilty of the offence he is charged with but is found guilty of a less serious offence (or he wishes to plead not guilty to the more serious offence but guilty to a lesser one), the section allows a verdict or plea of guilty to the lesser offence to be entered even though the offence may not be explicitly charged on the indictment. It also states if a defendant refuses to enter a plea then it defaults to not guilty.

Section 7(5) abolished forfeiture of lands, goods and chattels, and abolished outlawry. (The section is now repealed, but such repeals of repeals do not revive the repealed law.)

Part II – Obsolete crimes 

This Part implements recommendations of the Law Commission.

Section 13 abolished the common law offences of champerty and barratry, challenging to fight, eavesdropping, and being "a common scold or a common night walker". It also repealed the offence of praemunire (attempting to appeal to a foreign power, e.g. the pope, on legal matters), which had survived on the statute books since 1392. It preserved the common law offence of embracery (which was later abolished by the Bribery Act 2010). It also repealed the Blasphemy Act 1697.

This section extended only to Great Britain. However identical provision was made for Northern Ireland by section 16 of the Criminal Justice (Miscellaneous Provisions) Act (Northern Ireland) 1968.

Schedule 4: Repeals 

The Act repealed the following acts, among others: 

 The Profane Oaths Act 1745
 The Blasphemy Act 1697 
 The Sedition Act 1661

See also
Criminal Law Act

References
Criminal Law Revision Committee, Seventh Report: Felonies and Misdemeanours (Cmnd 2659)
The Law Commission, Proposals to Abolish Certain Ancient Criminal Offences (Law Com 3) HTML
The Law Commission, Proposals for Reform of the Law relating to Maintenance and Champerty (Law Com 7) HTML

External links

The Criminal Law Act 1967, as amended, from Legislation.gov.uk.
The Criminal Law Act 1967, as originally enacted, from Legislation.gov.uk: HTML PDF

United Kingdom Acts of Parliament 1967
English criminal law
Criminal law of the United Kingdom
Law enforcement use of force
Treason in the United Kingdom